Olivia D. Dudley Bucknam (November 16, 1874 - November 15, 1966) was president of the Opera Reading Club, Hollywood.

Early life
Olivia D. Dudley was born in Bryant Pond, Maine, on November 16, 1874, the daughter of Ansel Dudley and Josephine E. Childs.

Career
She was active in musical affairs of the community. She was first vice-president of the California Federation of Music Clubs and Cadman Creative Club. She was president and honorary president of the Opera Reading Club, Hollywood. She was a member of the Executive Board of the Woman's Committee of the Los Angeles Philharmonic Orchestra, the Woman's Committee of the Los Angeles Grand Opera Association and the Summer Concert Committee of the Hollywood Bowl Association. 

She was a member of the Woman's Club, Hollywood, Wa Wan Club, Hollywood chapter of Daughters of the American Revolution, Gables Beach Club.

Personal life
She moved to Hollywood, California, in 1914.

On February 10, 1903, she married Dr. Ralph Waldo Emerson Bucknam, a practicing physician in Hollywood since 1914. He was born in Lewiston, Maine, and obtained his education in Bowdoin Medical College, the Harvard Medical School.

She died on November 15, 1966, in Los Angeles, California.

References

1874 births
1966 deaths
People from Hollywood, Los Angeles
People from Woodstock, Maine